The Antichrist is a Christian concept based on the exegesis of Second Temple (500 BC–50 AD) Jewish texts that refer to anti-messiahs (see List of fictional Antichrists).

Antichrist or Antikrist may also refer to:

Books
The Antichrist (book), by Friedrich Nietzsche

Film
Antichrist (film), a 2009 film by Lars von Trier
The Antichrist (film), a 1974 film by Alberto De Martino

Music
Antikrist, an opera by Rued Langgaard
Antichrist (Das Ich album)
Antichrist (Gorgoroth album), by the black metal band Gorgoroth
Antichrist (Akercocke album), by the extreme metal band Akercocke
Antichrist Superstar, an album by Marilyn Manson
The Antichrist (album), by the thrash metal band Destruction
"The Antichrist", a song by the band Slayer on their debut album, Show No Mercy
The Antichrist (also, "Son of Maraka"), the name for a difficult vehicle that features prominently in The Gods Must Be Crazy
"Antichrist", a song by the band 1975 on their debut album, The 1975

Other
Antichrist (virus hoax), Spanish computer virus hoax

See also
Anti-Christian sentiment, encompasses discrimination and intolerance against Christians
Dajjal, the Islamic concept of the Antichrist

Distinguish from
Antikristos, a Greek, Armenian and Assyrian folk dance